Sir Benjamin Keene (1697–1757) was a British diplomat, who was British Ambassador to Spain from 1729 to 1739, then again from 1748 until his death in Madrid in December 1757. He has been described as "by far the most prominent British agent in Anglo-Spanish relations of the 18th century".

First appointed Consul General to Spain in 1724, he became Ambassador five years later, when he negotiated the 1729 Treaty of Seville ending the 1727 to 1729 Anglo-Spanish War. He later agreed the 1739 Convention of Pardo resolving trade and boundary issues in the Caribbean, but political opposition in England meant it was never ratified, leading to the 1739 to 1748 War of Jenkins' Ear.

On returning to England, he was elected Member of Parliament from 1740 to 1741 for Maldon, then for West Looe until 1747. He was appointed to the Board of Trade in 1741 and made Paymaster of Pensions in 1745; he found political life less interesting than diplomacy and in 1745 transferred to Lisbon as Ambassador to Portugal.

Following the 1748 Treaty of Aix-la-Chapelle, he returned to Madrid where his influence kept Spain neutral when the Seven Years' War began in 1756. His importance was such that he was kept in post until his death in December 1757, despite several requests he be allowed to retire due to ill-health. Although his successor lacked the same influence, Spain did not join the war against Britain until 1762, a major factor in British victory.

Biography
Benjamin Keene was born around 1697 in King's Lynn, Norfolk, eldest son of Charles Keene (1675–?) and Susan Rolfe (?–1753). His younger brother Edmund (1714–1781) was Bishop of Ely and Master of Peterhouse, Cambridge.

Both his father and uncle Benjamin served as Mayor of King's Lynn, as did his grandfather Edmund Rolfe (1640–1726). Rolfe was also election agent for Sir Robert Walpole, British Prime Minister from 1721 to 1742; this connection helped the careers of both Benjamin and his younger brother.

Keene was unmarried and left his estate to his brother Edmund; his nephew Benjamin (1753–1837) was MP for Cambridge from 1774 to 1786.

Career

1718 to 1746
Keene graduated from Pembroke College, Cambridge in 1718 and completed his legal studies at the Dutch university of Leiden. Family connections brought him to the notice of Secretary of State and Norfolk magnate, Viscount Townshend (1674–1738), who sent him to Madrid in 1723, first as an officer of the South Sea Company, then Consul from 1724.

The South Sea Company was established to hold commercial rights awarded to Britain in the 1713 Treaty of Utrecht, allowing access to the closed markets of Spanish America. They included the Asiento de Negros to supply 5,000 slaves a year and Navio de Permiso, permitting limited direct sales in Porto Bello and Veracruz. The company was acquired by the British government after going bankrupt in the 1720 'South Sea Bubble' and became a state enterprise.

The asiento itself was marginally profitable and has been described as a 'commercial illusion'; between 1717 and 1733, only eight ships were sent from Britain to the Americas. The real benefit was in carrying smuggled goods that evaded customs duties, demand from Spanish colonists creating a large and profitable black market. There was also a significant legitimate trade; British goods were imported through Cadiz, either for sale locally or re-exported to the colonies, Spanish dye and wool going the other way. A leading City of London merchant called the trade 'the best flower in our garden.'

The Spanish resented being forced to open their colonial markets, partly due to the prevailing economic theory of mercantilism, which viewed trade as a finite resource. This meant an increase in Britain's share was at the expense of Spain's and wars were often fought over commercial issues. Utrecht had also confirmed British possession of the Spanish ports of Gibraltar and Mahón; their desire to regain them was a factor in the 1718 to 1720 War of the Quadruple Alliance, as well Spanish support for the Jacobite rising of 1719. This made the post of British Consul highly important, held by someone of skill and intelligence.

Keene's first major role was to negotiate the Treaty of Seville, ending the 1727 to 1729 Anglo-Spanish War; credit for the treaty was taken by William Stanhope, who returned from two years absence in London for the purpose. He also negotiated the 1739 Convention of El Pardo, an attempt to prevent war between the two states; the terms were denounced by British merchants, and never ratified.

With the outbreak of the War of Jenkins' Ear in 1739, he returned to London, and was elected Member of Parliament for Maldon. Part of Henry Pelham's Whig administration, he was re-elected for West Looe in 1741; from 1741 to 1744, he was a member of the Board of Trade, then Paymaster of Pensions from 1745 to 1746.

1746 to 1757

In July 1746, French-born Philip V of Spain died and was succeeded by Ferdinand VI, who was more pro-British than his predecessor. British foreign policy was overseen by Pelham's younger brother, the Duke of Newcastle, who saw this as an opportunity to break the Bourbon alliance, and improve Britain's position in the War of the Austrian Succession.

Keene's personal correspondence shows he did not enjoy Parliamentary life, and he was happy to be appointed Ambassador to Portugal in 1745. Since Britain and Spain were still at war, his role in Lisbon was to open negotiations with the new Spanish regime, although his talks with the Marqués de Tabuérniga made little progress, largely because Britain refused to consider the return of Gibraltar.

After the 1748 Treaty of Aix-la-Chapelle ended the war, Keene resumed his position in Madrid; he quickly developed a good relationship with Ferdinand and his ministers, who shared Newcastle's aim of moving Spain away from France and closer to Britain. In October 1750, Keene helped negotiate the Treaty of Madrid, which resolved commercial issues between the two countries.

He also brokered the 1752 Treaty of Aranjuez between Spain, Austria and Sardinia, in which the three countries agreed to recognise each other's boundaries in Italy. In 1754 he helped remove the pro-French Marquis of Ensenada, who was replaced as Prime Minister by Ricardo Wall, former Spanish ambassador in London. His achievements were recognised with the award of the Order of the Bath by George II, presented to him by Ferdinand at a special ceremony.

Although Newcastle failed to prevent the 1756 Diplomatic Revolution, in which Austria allied with France, Spain initially stayed out of the Seven Years' War. Keene was now in poor health, but his request to be relieved was rejected since he was considered too valuable to British interests. He died in Madrid in 1757, and was replaced by George Hervey, 2nd Earl of Bristol, who did not have the same influence; Charles III of Spain succeeded Ferdinand in 1759, and in 1762 he entered the war on the side of France.

References

Sources
 
 
 
 
 
 
 
 
 Richard Lodge, The Private Correspondence of Sir Benjamin Keene. In: The English Historical Review, Vol. 49, No. 194 (Apr. 1934), pp. 344–45
 
 Rodger, N. A. M., The Insatiable Earl: A Life of John Montagu, Fourth Earl of Sandwich, 1718–1792. Harper Collins, 1993

External links
JSTOR The Private Correspondence of Sir Benjamin Keene

Sir Benjamin Keene's papers, GB/NNAF/P150670, National Archives
Portrait of Sir Benjamin Keene
Will of His Excellency, Sir Benjamin Keene, His Majesty's Ambassador Extraordinary and Plenipotentiary to the Catholic King of Madrid 
 

1697 births
1757 deaths
People from King's Lynn
People educated at King Edward VII Academy
Alumni of Pembroke College, Cambridge
Leiden University alumni
Members of the Parliament of Great Britain for West Looe
British MPs 1734–1741
British MPs 1741–1747
Fellows of the Royal Society
Ambassadors of Great Britain to Portugal
Ambassadors of Great Britain to Spain
Knights Companion of the Order of the Bath
Members of Parliament for Maldon